St. Boniface Roman Catholic Church was a Roman Catholic church located at 2356 Vermont Avenue in Detroit, Michigan. It was also known as St. Boniface-St. Vincent Roman Catholic Church. The church was designated a Michigan State Historic Site in 1983 and listed on the National Register of Historic Places in 1989, but was subsequently demolished in 1996. The church was removed from the NRHP in 2022.

History and significance
The German Catholic citizens of Detroit began moving to the west side in the 1860s, particularly along the Michigan Avenue corridor. In 1867, Bishop Casper Borgess created St. Boniface parish to serve the German population on the west side. In 1873, a two-story, red brick Italianate rectory building was built for the parish at a cost of $6,000. A stone church building was planned by the prominent local architect William M. Scott, and construction was completed in 1883 at a cost of $30,000.

The parish was closed in 1989, and the building was demolished in 1996.

Description
St. Boniface Church was an eclectic example of Romanesque Revival and Ruskinian Gothic architecture. It was built in a cruciform shape from red brick and cream-painted wood, and featured a high nave roof, steeply gabled stone entry arches, and a central pavilion with recessed round arches. The church had a square, louvered bell tower with an octagonal metal roof. The side walls were supported by heavy, stone-embellished buttresses. The rectory was  a two-story Italianate stone building, painted black. It had a modified hip-roof with cross-gabled dormers and a bracketed corniceline, an open gabled portico, and rectangular and round arch window enframements.

Gallery

References

Roman Catholic churches completed in 1882
19th-century Roman Catholic church buildings in the United States
Former Roman Catholic church buildings in Michigan
Churches in the Roman Catholic Archdiocese of Detroit
Churches on the National Register of Historic Places in Michigan
Demolished buildings and structures in Detroit
Demolished churches in the United States
Michigan State Historic Sites
German-American culture in Detroit
Buildings and structures demolished in 1992
National Register of Historic Places in Detroit